Enoch Obiero Agwanda (born 10 April 1994) is a Kenyan football striker who plays for SoNy Sugar.

References

1994 births
Living people
Kenyan footballers
Kenya international footballers
SoNy Sugar F.C. players
Sofapaka F.C. players
Gor Mahia F.C. players
Bandari F.C. (Kenya) players
Ushuru F.C. players
Association football forwards
People from Kisumu County